The  is a Japanese rekishi-monogatari (historical tale) written in the late Heian period.

Date and authorship
It has been speculated that the work was compiled in or shortly after 1170; Donald Keene, citing Isao Takehana, stated that the work was probably written between the eighth month of 1174 and the seventh month of 1175. The author is uncertain, but the most likely candidate is the waka poet .

Structure and style
It has been suggested that the writer chose a woman as his fictional narrator where the Ōkagami'''s author had chosen two men that he wished to focus on more elegant "feminine" topics than military and political affairs.

The work contains 140 waka and countless references to Japanese and Chinese literature.

Content
The work begins with a group of pilgrims visiting the temples of Yamato Province being approached by an elderly woman who, when asked if she lives in the region, says that she lived in the Capital for one hundred years and then in Yamashiro Province for another fifty, before moving to Yamato. The listeners are astonished at her great age, but she humbly replies by listing several others in China and Japan who had supposedly lived to great age, including her grandfather Yotsugi.

The rest of the work describes the old lady's recollections of the past. It describes the period of roughly 150 years from 1025 to 1170. and is primarily focused on an account of the imperial family and the Fujiwara and Murakami-Genji clans.

Relationship to other works
The work is classified as one of the four "mirrors" of history along with the Ōkagami, Mizukagami and Masukagami.Nishizawa "Rekishi-monogatari" IN Nishizawa (ed.) 2002 : 249. It is considered to be a direct continuation of the Ōkagami.

Although it was written during the period of rule by the Taira military clan (Japanese Wikipedia article), its focus is on waka poetry and the affairs of nobles at court.

See also
 Ōkagami Mizukagami Masukagami''

References

Bibliography

External links
Full text at Nihon Bungaku Denshi Toshokan.
Scanned copy of full text available from the National Institute of Japanese Literature.

1170s books
1170s in Japan
Heian period in literature
Late Old Japanese texts
Monogatari
12th-century Japanese books
History books of the Heian Period